Santa Maria Assunta in Cielo is a Baroque-style, Roman Catholic church in the town of Cantalupo in Sabina, in the province of Rieti, region of Lazio, Italy. It is the main parish church in Cantalupo.

History 
This 17th-century church was built under the patronage of the Ricci family, whose coat of arms is on the base of the main altar. The oval plan with a semicircular apse is attributed to Francesco Rosa (architect) and Carlo Fontana. The interio has rich baroque marble decoration, and a 1753 canvas as a main altarpiece depicting the Assumption of the Virgin with Saint Blaise.

References

Roman Catholic churches in Lazio
Churches in the province of Rieti
17th-century Roman Catholic church buildings in Italy
Baroque architecture in Lazio